Louis Bocquet (25 February 1922 – 17 December 1973) was a French racing cyclist. He competed in the 1947 Tour de France, riding for the team Peugeot-Dunlop.

He is the younger brother of Maurice Bocquet, also a professional rider.

References

External links

1922 births
1973 deaths
French male cyclists
Place of birth missing